Eudonia gracilineata is a moth in the family Crambidae. It was described by Nuss in 2000. It is found in Lesotho.

References

Moths described in 2000
Eudonia